Christoph Holste (born May 24, 1984) is a German footballer who plays as a defensive midfielder. He is currently a free agent.

Career

Holste began his professional career with 1. FC Saarbrücken, where he made two appearances in the 2. Bundesliga, before being released in 2005. After six months out of the game, he signed for FC Homburg in January 2006, before leaving for SV Elversberg in 2010. He began in the club's reserve team, but was promoted to the first team squad in 2011. In 2013, he signed for SVN Zweibrücken.

External links

1984 births
Living people
1. FC Saarbrücken players
FC 08 Homburg players
SV Elversberg players
SVN Zweibrücken players
Association football midfielders
German footballers